Kong Som Eun (born c. 1947– c. 1976) was a famous Cambodian actor and film director who ruled the Cambodian film industry from the mid-1960s through the early 1970s.

Career 
Kong Som Eun ranked higher than all Cambodian actors of the late 1960s and early 1970s. He starred in more than half of the films released per year from the years 1967–1975 giving him a total of more than 120 films in less than ten years. His career was cut short when the Khmer Rouge took power in Cambodia in 1975. It is believed that he died in 1976 under circumstances that remain unclear.

Partial filmography

References 
 

1940s births
Year of birth uncertain
1970s deaths
Year of death uncertain
Cambodian male film actors
20th-century Cambodian male actors
People who died in the Cambodian genocide